Samuel Wells Morris (September 1, 1786 – May 25, 1847) was a Democratic member of the U.S. House of Representatives from Pennsylvania.

Samuel W. Morris was born in Philadelphia, Pennsylvania, the son of Benjamin Wistar Morris.  He pursued an academic degree at Princeton College.  He studied law, was admitted to the bar and commenced practice in Wellsboro, Pennsylvania.  He was a judge of the district court and served as the first treasurer of Wellsboro County.  He was postmaster of Wellsboro from July 1, 1808, to April 1, 1813.  He was a member of the Pennsylvania House of Representatives.

Morris was elected as a Democrat to the Twenty-fifth and Twenty-sixth Congresses, serving from September 4, 1837, till March 3, 1841.  He was not a candidate for reelection in 1840 to the Twenty-seventh Congress.  He died in Wellsboro in 1847.

Sources

 The Political Graveyard

1786 births
1847 deaths
Democratic Party members of the Pennsylvania House of Representatives
Princeton University alumni
Pennsylvania lawyers
Pennsylvania postmasters
Democratic Party members of the United States House of Representatives from Pennsylvania
Pennsylvania state court judges
19th-century American politicians
19th-century American judges
19th-century American lawyers